Octobering was a naming ceremony which occurred during the early era of the Soviet Union, which involved giving a name to a newborn, introduced by the state on the official basis of Marxist–Leninist atheism as an attempt to replace the religious tradition of christening. Oktyabriny not to be confused with Oktyabrina, which is a new Soviet-born given name. All three words are derived from the word Oktyabr, (October), in commemoration of the October Revolution.

Despite being short-lived, this so-called new Soviet rite contributed to the proliferation of the new names based on revolutionary phraseology, such as Oktyabrina, Vladlen (for Vladimir Lenin), etc.

References

Naming ceremonies
Soviet culture